Southwestern University is in Georgetown, Texas, U.S.

Southwestern University may also refer to:

Southwestern University (Philippines) in Cebu City, Philippines
National Southwestern Associated University, China

See also
Southwest University (disambiguation)
Southwest College, a community college in Houston, Texas
Southwestern College (disambiguation)
Southwestern Community College (disambiguation)
Southwestern Law School, Los Angeles